Moema is a metro station on Line 5 (Lilac) of the São Paulo Metro in the Moema district of São Paulo, Brazil. On 31 March 2018, during the opening of Line 13-Jade of CPTM, Governor of São Paulo Geraldo Alckmin confirmed the opening of Moema station in 5 April 2018, alongside the opening of Oscar Freire station in 4 April 2018 and other stations of Line 15-Silver monorail in the same week.

References

São Paulo Metro stations
Railway stations opened in 2018